Saginaw County, officially the County of Saginaw, is a county located in the U.S. state of Michigan. As of the 2020 Census, the population was 190,124. The county seat is Saginaw. The county was created by September 10, 1822, and was fully organized on February 9, 1835. The etymology of the county's name is uncertain. It may be derived from Sace-nong or Sak-e-nong, as the Sauk tribe is believed by some to have once lived there. A more likely possibility is that it comes from Ojibwe words meaning "place of the outlet" –sag and ong. See List of Michigan county name etymologies.

Saginaw County comprises the Saginaw, MI Metropolitan Statistical Area and is included in the Saginaw-Midland-Bay City Combined Statistical Area, the 5th largest metropolitan area in Michigan.

Etymology
The name Saginaw is widely believed to mean "where the Sauk were" in Ojibwe, from Sace-nong or Sak-e-nong (Sauk Town), due to the belief that the Sauk once lived there. But it is more likely that the name means "place of the outlet", from the Ojibwe sag (opening) and ong (place of).

When Natives told Samuel de Champlain that the Sauk nation was on the western shore of Lake Michigan, Champlain mistakenly placed them on the western shore of Lake Huron. This mistake was copied on subsequent maps, and future references identified this as the place of the Sauks. Champlain himself never visited what is now Michigan.

History
The area was inhabited from about 1000 B.C. to 1000 A.D. by the Native American Hopewell culture, followed by the Anishnabeg. Some historians believe that the Sauk at one time lived in the area and were driven out by Ojibwe (Chippewa), before the area was first visited by Europeans.

The Saginaw region includes an extensive network of many rivers and streams which converge into the Saginaw River and provided a means for easy travel for the Native American population among numerous settlements and hunting areas, as well as access to Lake Huron. Saginaw was also a frequent meeting location for councils of the Ojibwe, Pottawatomi, and Ottawa—the Three Fires of the Anishnabeg.

What is today Saginaw County was inhabited by the Ojibwe at the time of the arrival of Euro-Americans.  The Ojibwe were still the dominant force in the area in the 1820s, and in 1827 they were attacked by a two groups of Winnebago people coming from Wisconsin.  The Ojibwe prevailed in this fight with the aid of local Euro-American settlers.

In 1853 the Ojibwe and Ottawa both established large hunting camps along the Saginaw River, although Euro-American settlers were beginning to establish saw mills and farms in the area by that point.

Geography
It is part of the Flint/Tri-Cities region of Mid-Michigan.

Primary rivers
 Saginaw River
 Shiawassee River
 Cass River
 Flint River
 Bad River
 Tittabawassee River

Wildlife refuge
 Shiawassee National Wildlife Refuge

Adjacent counties
 Bay County  (northeast)
 Midland County  (northwest)
 Tuscola County  (east)
 Gratiot County  (west)
 Genesee County  (southeast)
 Shiawassee County  (south)
 Clinton County  (southwest)

Demographics

The 2010 United States Census indicates Saginaw County had a 2010 population of 200,169. This is a decrease of -9,870 people from the 2000 United States Census. Overall, the county had a -4.7% growth rate during this ten-year period. In 2010 there were 79,011 households and 52,287 families in the county. The population density was 250.2 per square mile (96.6 square kilometers). There were 86,844 housing units at an average density of 108.5 per square mile (41.9 square kilometers). The racial and ethnic makeup of the county was 70.5% White, 18.6% Black or African American, 0.3% Native American, 1.0% Asian, 7.8% Hispanic or Latino, 0.1% from other races, and 1.6% from two or more races.

There were 79,011 households, out of which 30.5% had children under the age of 18 living with them, 45.4% were husband and wife families, 16.0% had a female householder with no husband present, 33.8% were non-families, and 28.2% were made up of individuals. The average household size was 2.44 and the average family size was 2.99.

In the county, 23.4% of the population was under the age of 18, 10.6% from 18 to 24, 22.9% from 25 to 44, 27.8% from 45 to 64, and 15.3% was 65 years of age or older. The median age was 40 years. For every 100 females there were 93.6 males. For every 100 females age 18 and over, there were 90.4 males.

The 2010 American Community Survey 1-year estimate indicates the median income for a household in the county was $41,938 and the median income for a family was $52,243. Males had a median income of $27,691 versus $16,488 for females. The per capita income for the county was $21,025. About 12.4% of families and 16.9% of the population were below the poverty line, including 24.1% of those under the age 18 and 10.1% of those age 65 or over.

Religion
The Roman Catholic Diocese of Saginaw is the controlling regional body for the Catholic Church.

Government and politics
The county government operates the jail, maintains rural roads, operates the
major local courts, keeps files of deeds and mortgages, maintains vital records, administers
public health regulations, and participates with the state in the provision of welfare and
other social services. The county board of commissioners controls the
budget but has only limited authority to make laws or ordinances.  In Michigan, most local
government functions — police and fire, building and zoning, tax assessment, street
maintenance, etc. — are the responsibility of individual cities and townships.

Starting in 1988, Saginaw County became a reliable Democratic stronghold at the Presidential level. However, in recent elections it has become increasingly competitive, with Donald Trump narrowly winning the county in 2016 while narrowly losing it in 2020 by about 300 votes.

Elected officials
 Prosecuting Attorney: John McColgan Jr.
 Sheriff: William Federspiel
 County Clerk: Vanessa Guerra
 County Treasurer: Timothy M. Novak
 Register of Deeds: Katheryn A. Kelly
 Public Works Commissioner: Brian Wendling
All countywide officers are elected for four-year terms. The next scheduled election for these offices is November of 2024.

(information as of April 2021)

Parks and Recreation Commission
Saginaw County Parks and Recreation Commission is a county-wide government organization founded by William H. Haithco Sr. in 1969. Haithco then served as chairman from 1972 to 1999. The organization operates six parks throughout the county - Imerman Memorial Park, Veterans Memorial Park, Ringwood Forest, Price Nature Center, William H. Haithco Recreation Area, and The Saginaw Valley Rail Trail. These parks comprise over 550 acres, including 18 miles of hiking trails, two boat launches, four fishing access sites, a swimming beach, picnic shelters, and recreation programs.

Economy
The largest employers in Saginaw County are:

Transportation
Saginaw County was the destination of a Sauk footpath that became one of the first roads in what is now Michigan, the Saginaw Trail. The trail, first authorized in 1819, was completed to Saginaw in 1841. Since then, Saginaw's access to the outside world has expanded with the development of maritime, rail, air, and freeway links to the major cities of Michigan and neighboring states and nations.

Airports
Scheduled airline service is available from MBS International Airport near Freeland, Michigan and  Bishop International Airport in Flint, Michigan.  Harry Browne Airport in Buena Vista Charter Township also serves the region.

Highways
 , a major north–south freeway running from Sault Ste. Marie, Michigan to Miami-Dade County, Florida
 , a business route freeway from Interstate 75 passing through downtown Saginaw
 
  runs from I-69 through downtown Saginaw and north to Standish.
 
  is a cross peninsular road, running across the mitten and the thumb—from Port Sanilac on the Lake Huron shore; through Saginaw near Saginaw Bay; and then on to Muskegon on the Lake Michigan shore.  This east-west surface route nearly bisects the Lower Peninsula of Michigan latitudinally.
  passes through the western suburbs and provides a direct connection to MBS International Airport in Freeland before ending at US 10 in nearby Bay County.
  runs from the Ohio border through Adrian and Owosso before ending at M-46, in the western suburbs of Saginaw. M-52 also provides an alternate connection to Lansing, Michigan's state capitol.
 
 
  runs from M-47 to I-675.
  runs east from M-13 to Caro and Cass City and ends at M-53 in Sanilac County.
 
  runs from M-25 in downtown Bay City to M-58 in Saginaw.

Maritime
The Saginaw River is maintained by the Corps of Engineers, and from time to time, dredged to maintain a shipping channel down the river to Bay City, and from there, to the Great Lakes.

Education

Primary and secondary education

Public schools

Most of Saginaw County is served by the Saginaw Intermediate School District (SISD), which coordinates the efforts of local boards of education, but has no operating authority over schools. Local school boards in Michigan retain great autonomy over day-to-day operations. A number of charter schools also operate in the county.

School districts in the county (including any with any territory, no matter how slight, even if the schools and/or administration are in other counties) include:

 Ashley Community Schools
 Bay City School District
 Birch Run Area School District
 Breckenridge Community Schools
 Bridgeport-Spaulding Community School District
 Carrollton School District
 Chesaning Union Schools
 Clio Area School District
 Frankenmuth School District
 Freeland Community School District
 Hemlock Public School District
 Merrill Community Schools
 Montrose Community Schools
 New Lothrop Area Public School
 Ovid-Elsie Area Schools
 Reese Public Schools
 Saginaw City School District
 Saginaw Township Community Schools
 St. Charles Community Schools
 Swan Valley School District

Former school districts include:
 Buena Vista School District

Higher education
 Saginaw Valley State University (SVSU) is a four-year state university located in eastern Kochville Township.
 Delta College is a two-year community college that serves Saginaw County, but is located in neighboring Bay County, a few miles to the north of the SVSU campus.

Notable natives

 George C. Hinkley (1892-1936), Wisconsin State Assemblyman and businessman, was born in Saginaw County.
 Theodore Roethke (1908–1963) Pulitzer prize and National Book Award-winning poet was born and buried here.

Historical markers
There are twenty eight recognized historical markers in the county:  They are:
 Bliss Park
 Burt Opera House / Wellington R. Burt
 Coal Mine No. 8
 The Cushway House / Benjamin Cushway and Adelaide Cushway
 First Congregational Church [Saginaw]
 Fowler Schoolhouse (Fremont Township)
 Frankenmuth / Saint Lorenz Evangelical Lutheran Church
 Frankenmuth Bavarian Inn
 Freeland United Methodist Church
 George Nason House
 Hess School
 Hoyt Library
 Leamington Stewart House
 Michigan's German Settlers
 Morseville Bridge
 Presbyterian Church of South Saginaw
 Saginaw Club
 Saginaw Oil Industry
 Saginaw Post Office
 Saginaw Valley Coal
 Saginaw Valley Lumbering Era
 St. Mary's Hospital
 Saint Michael Catholic Parish
 St. Paul's Episcopal Mission
 Shroeder House
 Theodore Roethke / Childhood Home

Communities

Cities
 Frankenmuth
 Saginaw (county seat)
 Zilwaukee

Villages
 Birch Run
 Chesaning
 Merrill
 Oakley
 Reese (partially)
 St. Charles

Charter townships
 Bridgeport Charter Township
 Buena Vista Charter Township
 Saginaw Charter Township

Civil townships

 Albee Township
 Birch Run Township
 Blumfield Township
 Brady Township
 Brant Township
 Carrollton Township
 Chapin Township
 Chesaning Township
 Frankenmuth Township
 Fremont Township
 James Township
 Jonesfield Township
 Kochville Township
 Lakefield Township
 Maple Grove Township
 Marion Township
 Richland Township
 Spaulding Township
 St. Charles Township
 Swan Creek Township
 Taymouth Township
 Thomas Township
 Tittabawassee Township
 Zilwaukee Township

Census-designated places
 Bridgeport
 Buena Vista
 Burt
 Freeland
 Hemlock
 Robin Glen-Indiantown
 Shields

Other unincorporated communities

 Alicia
 Blumfield Corners
 Brady Center
 Brant
 Chapin
 Clausedale
 Crow Island
 Dice
 Fenmore
 Fergus
 Fordney
 Fosters
 Frankentrost
 Frost
 Galloway
 Garfield
 Gera
 Groveton
 Indiantown
 Iva
 Kochville
 Lakefield
 Lawndale
 Layton Corners
 Luce
 Marion Springs
 Morseville
 Nelson
 Orr
 Racy
 Paines
 Parshallburg
 Roosevelt
 Shattuckville
 Swan Creek
 Taymouth

See also
 List of Michigan State Historic Sites in Saginaw County, Michigan
 National Register of Historic Places listings in Saginaw County, Michigan
 Saginaw Trail

References

Further reading

External links

 Saginaw County
 Historic Bridges: Saginaw County, Michigan

 
Michigan counties
1835 establishments in Michigan Territory
Populated places established in 1835